Cheng Mouyi (born on 24 February 1985) is a Chinese footballer who currently plays as either a midfielder or right-back for Suzhou Dongwu in the China League One division.

Club career
Cheng started his professional football career when he joined Zhejiang Lucheng in 2000 as a youth player. With them he would graduate from their youth team to their senior team and establish himself as a prominent member within the team. This was to coincide with Zhejiang Lucheng's steady progress towards to the top tier, which eventually happened in the 2007 league season when Zhejiang won promoted after coming second in the second tier. Cheng would play a major part in keeping Zhejiang in the 2007 Chinese Super League table when he played in 24 league games. When Zhejiang Lucheng renamed themselves Hangzhou Greentown in the 2008 Chinese Super League season and move to Hangzhou, Cheng would follow them and continue to be an important member of the team when he played in a further 23 league games to help establish his team in the top tier. He was released by Hangzhou at the end of 2009.

He joined Serbian SuperLiga side Spartak Subotica on a free transfer and he made his debut on 22 July 2010, in a 2–0 home win against FC Differdange 03 at the Second leg of 2010–11 UEFA Europa League Second qualifying round. Throughout the season he would only play in three league games before being released at the end of the season and return to China where he joined second tier football club Fujian Smart Hero at the beginning of the 2012 Chinese league season.

On 26 January 2016, Cheng returned to Hangzhou Greentown.

Career statistics
Statistics accurate as of match played 31 December 2019.

Honours
Chongqing Lifan
China League One: 2014

References

External links
 
 Player profile at 7m.cn
 Player stats at sohu.com
 Profile at Srbijafudbal.
 Cheng Mouyi Stats at Utakmica.rs

1985 births
Living people
Chinese footballers
Footballers from Hubei
Association football midfielders
Zhejiang Professional F.C. players
Cangzhou Mighty Lions F.C. players
Chongqing Liangjiang Athletic F.C. players
South China AA players
FK Spartak Subotica players
Suzhou Dongwu F.C. players
Serbian SuperLiga players
Hong Kong First Division League players
Chinese expatriate footballers
Expatriate footballers in Bulgaria
Expatriate footballers in Serbia
Chinese Super League players
China League One players
China League Two players